Starkers in Tokyo is a live acoustic album by English rock band Whitesnake, released only in Japan on 9 September 1997. It is performed in the style of the Unplugged series and simply features David Coverdale on vocals and Adrian Vandenberg on acoustic guitar.  The performance was recorded at the EMI studios in Japan for a small audience of fans in support of the most recent album "Restless Heart". This recording was also released on VHS and Laserdisc in Japan Only. This CD was released outside Japan almost 1 year later in June 1998.

The album includes an acoustic version of Whitesnake's biggest hit "Here I Go Again".

Track listing
 "Sailing Ships" (David Coverdale, Adrian Vandenberg) – 4:37
 "Too Many Tears" (Coverdale, Vandenberg) – 4:13
 "The Deeper the Love" (Coverdale, Vandenberg) – 4:09
 "Love Ain't No Stranger" (Coverdale, Mel Galley) – 3:15
 "Can't Go On" (Coverdale, Vandenberg) – 3:50
 "Give Me All Your Love" (Coverdale, John Sykes) – 3:21
 "Don't Fade Away" (Coverdale, Vandenberg) – 4:26
 "Is This Love" (Coverdale, Sykes) – 3:09
 "Here I Go Again" (Coverdale, Bernie Marsden) – 4:46
 "Soldier of Fortune" (Coverdale, Ritchie Blackmore) – 4:22

Track listing DVD version
 "Sailing Ships" (David Coverdale, Adrian Vandenberg) – 4:37
 "Too Many Tears" (Coverdale, Vandenberg) – 4:13
 "The Deeper the Love" (Coverdale, Vandenberg) – 4:09
 "Can't Go On" (Coverdale, Vandenberg) – 3:50
 "Is This Love" (Coverdale, Sykes) – 3:09
 "Give Me All Your Love" (Coverdale, John Sykes) – 3:21
 "Here I Go Again" (Coverdale, Bernie Marsden) – 4:46
 "Soldier of Fortune" (Coverdale, Ritchie Blackmore) – 4:22
 "Love Ain't No Stranger" (Coverdale, Mel Galley) – 3:15
 "Don't Fade Away" (Coverdale, Vandenberg) – 4:26

Songs left off the album
 "Burning Heart" (Vandenberg)
 "Fool for Your Loving" (Coverdale, Micky Moody, Marsden)
 "Only My Soul" (Coverdale)

Personnel
David Coverdale - vocals
Adrian Vandenberg - acoustic guitar

Charts

References

External links
Official website

Whitesnake live albums
1997 live albums
Whitesnake video albums
1997 video albums
Live video albums
EMI Records live albums
Universal Music Group video albums
Rock albums by English artists
Live rock albums